Murli Manohar Advocate (born 15 December 1895) was an Indian politician from Uttar Pradesh state, and the member of parliament in 1962 for the Ballia Lok Sabha constituency from Indian National Congress.

References

India MPs 1962–1967
Indian National Congress politicians
People from Ballia district
Banaras Hindu University alumni
1895 births
Year of death missing
Lok Sabha members from Uttar Pradesh
Indian National Congress politicians from Uttar Pradesh